General elections were held in Malawi on 29 June 1978. As the country had become a one-party state in 1966, the Malawi Congress Party was the sole legal party at the time. However, unlike the two previous elections, in which President-for-life Hastings Banda had selected a single candidate for each constituency, in this election there was more than one nominated candidate in 47 of the 87 seats. Candidates ran unopposed in 33 of the remaining seats, and seven were left vacant as the candidates failed the English proficiency test. Of the estimated 3,000,000 registered voters, around 371,000 cast votes.

Results

References

Malawi
1978 in Malawi
Elections in Malawi
One-party elections
June 1978 events in Africa
Election and referendum articles with incomplete results